Nafa Indria Urbach (born 15 June 1980) is an Indonesian soap opera actress and singer. She began her career in the entertainment world through with her song "Bagai Lilin Kecil" composed by Deddy Dores. She is often referred to as the successor to the singer Nike Ardilla.

Biography
Nafa Indria Urbach was born 15 June 1980 in Magelang to Ronald Urbach and Neneng Maria Kusuma. Nafa is the third of the couple's four  children; she has two older sisters named Farah and Maya and a younger brother named Alam. Her father was an Ashkenazi Jew of Dutch-German descent and her mother is Javanese. She is the aunt of the Indonesian pianist Joey Alexander.

Urbach was in a relationship with Iranian-Indonesian actor , who has made appearances in these music videos, starting with "Hatiku Bagai Terpenjara" and ending with "Tiada Dusta Di Hatiku", from 1997 to 2001. Urbach was born a Christian but after dating Yustisio for several years she had converted to Islam. Urbach married the Chinese Indonesian actor Zack Lee in Jakarta on 16 February 2007. Urbach had met Lee in a nightclub, four years earlier. Though Urbach and Lee had different religious origins, in September 2003 Urbach announced that she had converted from Islam back to Christianity before marrying Lee.

After her wedding Nafa had a miscarriage in September 2007, when she was two months pregnant. She gave birth on 8 February 2011 to a daughter, Mikhaela Lee Jowono.

Filmography

Soap operas 

 Deru Debu
 Kembalinya Si Manis Jembatan Ancol
 Bidadari Yang Terluka
 Permataku
 Terpikat
 Pertalian
 Dua Kali Aku Mencintamu
 Kehormatan
 Kalau Cinta Sudah Bicara
 Kalau Cinta Sudah Bicara 2
 Mau Nggak Mau Harus Mau
 Pelangari Bidadariku
 Putih Merah
 Permaisari Hatiku
 Langkahku
 Penconpet Cinta 3
 Kurindu Jiwaku
 Pelangi di Wajahku 1
 Pelangi di Wajahku 2
 Aishiteru
 Raja Dan Aku
 Segalanya Cinta
 Juna Cinta Juni
 Sepatu Super
 Misteri Toko Antik
 Rahasia Aura
 Malu Malu Kucing

Discography

Albums
 Bagai Lilin Kecil (1995)
 Hatiku Bagai Terpenjara (1996)
 Hati Tergores Cinta (1996)
 Hati Yang Kecewa (1997)
 Hatiku Bagai Di Sangkar Emas (1998)
 Tiada Dusta Di Hatiku (1999)
 Bilakah (2000)
 Gita Cinta (2000)
 Jujur Saja (2001)
 Berlari (2004)
 Ku Tak Sempurna (2010)

Singles
 Deru Debu (1997)
 Bandung Menangis Lagi (1995)
 Hati Yang Rindu (1998)
 Wanita Super (2009)
 Cinta Abadi (2009)
 Belahan Jiwa (2014)
 Melepasmu Kelemahanku (2017)

Unreleased Song
 Ost Ku rindu Jiwaku (2004)
 Pertamaku Jatuh Cinta (2014/2017)
 Cintaku Bukan Hiasan (2014/2017)
 Selamatkan Cinta (2014/2021)

References

External links
 
  Profil Nafa Urbach Kapanlagi.com
 Instagram Nafa Urbach

1980 births
Living people
Indo people
Javanese people
Indonesian people of German descent
Indonesian people of German-Jewish descent
Indonesian people of Dutch-Jewish descent
Indonesian child singers
21st-century Indonesian women singers
Indonesian rock singers
Indonesian dangdut singers
Indonesian dance musicians
Indonesian female models
Indonesian child actresses
Indonesian television actresses
21st-century Indonesian actresses
Indonesian former Muslims
Converts to Protestantism from Islam
Indonesian Protestants
Indonesian Christians
People from Magelang